Sarah Charlotte Mangelsdorf is an American educator, scholar, and the eleventh president of the University of Rochester.

Career
As a psychologist, the focus of Mangelsdorf's research has been on the social and emotional development of infants and toddlers.
She has held leadership positions at Northwestern University and the University of Illinois at Champaign-Urbana.

Mangelsdorf was provost at the University of Wisconsin at Madison where she was credited with advancing fundraising, coping with budget cuts, improving the school's overall ranking, successfully retaining key faculty members, and improving relations with the state of Wisconsin. Her responsibilities at Madison included oversight of all academic programs for its twelve colleges and schools, including budgeting.

Mangelsdorf became as the eleventh president of the University of Rochester in July 2019. She is the first woman to hold that post.

Personal life
Mangelsdorf is married to Karl Rosengren who is a developmental psychologist on the University of Rochester faculty.

Her father, Paul Christoph Mangelsdorf Jr., was a physics professor at Swarthmore College, and her grandfather Paul Christoph Mangelsdorf was a professor of botany at Harvard University.

References

External links
U of R presidents website

American feminists
Presidents of the University of Rochester
Child psychologists
Living people
University of Rochester faculty
Oberlin College alumni
University of Minnesota alumni
Year of birth missing (living people)